The 1918 season of the Paraguayan Primera División, the top category of Paraguayan football, was played by 9 teams. The national champions were Cerro Porteño.

Results

Standings

National title play-offs

External links
Paraguay 1918 season at RSSSF

Paraguayan Primera División seasons
Para
1